Castrocielo is a comune (municipality) in the province of Frosinone in the Italian region Lazio, located about  southeast of Rome and about  southeast of Frosinone.

Castrocielo borders the following municipalities: Aquino, Colle San Magno, Piedimonte San Germano, Pontecorvo, Roccasecca.

People
Angelo Savoldi (1914-2013), American professional wrestler

References

Cities and towns in Lazio